Paso Canoas is an international city shared between Puntarenas Province in Costa Rica and Chiriquí Province in the west of Panama. The border between Costa Rica and Panama crosses Paso Canoas from north to south, with the result that the city is both Costa Rican and Panamanian.

In Costa Rica, Paso Canoas is the located in Canoas, the third district of the canton of Corredores, in Puntarenas Province (in the Brunca region in the south of the country).  

In Panama, it belongs to the corregimiento of Progreso, in Barú District, Chiriquí.

Because the city is located in a border region, trade is very important for the inhabitants of the area.

Education 
Canoas has primary and secondary educational institutions, both private and public. Also, several Costa Rican universities have headquarters in the region: the National University of Costa Rica (Campus Coto) opened a new center for providing public higher education to nearby communities. The Latin University of Costa Rica and the Universidad Metropolitana Castro Carazo are also present in Paso Canoas.

Health 
The medical institutions in the area include:
 EBAIS de Paso Canoas
 Hospital de Ciudad Nelly
 Clínica medica de la Cuesta

Nearby cities

In Costa Rica 
 Ciudad Neily (Seat of the canton of Corredores, which includes Paso Canoas)
 La Cuesta
 Laurel
 San Vito
 Río Claro
 Golfito
 San Isidro de El General

In Panama 
 San José de David
 Río Sereno
 Puerto Armuelles
 Concepción
 Progreso
 Bugaba

References

External links 
 Instituto Nacional de Estadística y Censos de Costa Rica
 Go Visit Costa Rica

Populated places in Puntarenas Province
Populated places in Chiriquí Province
Costa Rica–Panama border crossings